Masgouf (Arabic: المسكوف), is a Mesopotamian dish consisting of seasoned, grilled carp; it is often considered the national dish of Iraq.

Geographical distribution

The Iraqi capital city Baghdad prides itself on making the best masgouf, with the Abu Nawas district on the shores of the Tigris river, "dedicated" to this dish. Nonetheless, one can find masgouf all over Iraq, especially near the Tigris-Euphrates Basin.

Outside of Iraq, masguf is more or less popular eastern parts of Syria, especially in the regions bordering Iraq, such as in the Raqqa Governorate, which is crossed by the Euphrates. It is also seen, at a lesser scale, Turkey, such as Nusaybin and Cizre, on the Iraqi border.

Masguf is now also found in Damascus due to a high number of Iraqis who lived there after the 2003 invasion of Iraq. In the district of Jeremana alone, where most Iraqis lived, there were more than ten masgûf restaurants, all staffed by Iraqis. The fish is brought daily from the Syrian Euphrates to these restaurants, and is kept alive in a fishpond or a big aquarium until it is ordered.

Preparation and serving

The fish is caught alive and weighed. It is clubbed to kill it, partially scaled and gutted. 
The fish is then split lengthwise down the back, washed and spread out into a single flat piece. This opens the fish into the shape of a large, symmetrical circle, while leaving the belly intact.
From there, the cook bastes the inside of the fish with a marinade of olive oil, rock salt, tamarind, and ground turmeric. Crushed tomatoes and coriander are sometimes added to the marinade.

The fish is then either impaled on two sharp iron spikes, or placed in a big iron, clamshell grill with a handle and a locking snare, designed specifically for this dish.

The fish, either clamped in the grill or mounted on the spikes, is then placed next to the fire on the "fire altar", a feature shared by all masgûf restaurants. 
This "altar" typically consists of a big open-air area centered by a raised, podium-like sandbox that is either round, octagonal or sometimes rectangular, in the middle of which there is a large fire of apricot tree logs.

Cooking typically takes between one and three hours, until most of the fish's fat is burned off, during which time the guests will pick at their mezes.

When the fish is well cooked, it is laid on the coals, skin side down. This crisps the skin and helps release the flesh from it for serving ease.
The whole fish is typically laid on a large tray garnished with lime (or lemon), slices of onion and Iraqi pickles. Sometimes, in Baghdad, a little mango chutney is also spread on the inside. The tray is then covered by a large crispy flatbread straight of a clay oven to keep its contents hot until served to the client.

Variations
The Turkmens of northern Iraq are known to prepare a similar recipe, often using a clay oven.

See also
Iraqi cuisine
Middle Eastern cuisine

Notes

Masguf arguably being the most famous dish of Iraq, it is also the one that is always the foremost served to foreign delegations visiting the country by the Iraqi statesmen.
Two notable admirers of this dish are said to be the former President of France, Jacques Chirac and Vladimir Zhirinovsky, the former chairman of the Russian Duma. Chirac apparently fell for masgûf during a visit to Iraq in a formal dinner given to his honor by Saddam Hussein.

Gallery

References

Further reading

Arab cuisine
Assyrian cuisine
Fish dishes
Iraqi cuisine
Levantine cuisine
Saudi Arabian cuisine
National dishes